The  is a Japanese aerial lift line in Kamikawa, Hokkaidō, operated by . The company also operates a travel agency, a hotel in Asahidake Onsen, and chairlifts at Mount Moiwa Ski Resort, Sapporo. Opened in 1967, the aerial lift climbs Mount Kuro of the Daisetsuzan Mountains from the  hot spring resort. A chairlift is connected to the line, climbing higher. The line transports skiers in winter, hikers in summer, and autumn color spectators in autumn. This is currently the northernmost aerial lift (excluding chairlifts) in the country, after  in Wakkanai closed in 2006.

Basic data
System: Aerial tramway, 2 track cables and 2 haulage ropes
Cable length: 
Vertical interval: 
Maximum gradient: 29°54′
Operational speed: 5.0 m/s
Passenger capacity per a cabin: 101
Cabins: 2
Stations: 2
Duration of one-way trip: 7 minutes

See also
List of aerial lifts in Japan

External links
 Official website

Aerial tramways in Japan
Tourist attractions in Hokkaido
Transport in Hokkaido
Infrastructure completed in 1967
1967 establishments in Japan